Arjen de Vreede (born 26 April 1962 in Utrecht, The Netherlands), known by his stage name DJ DNA, is a Dutch DJ and producer. At age seventeen, he started as a DJ, and became a pioneer in the Dutch music scene playing hip hop, house, acid house and techno in renowned Dutch clubs such as the Roxy and the Vrije Vloer. He also co-founded the band Urban Dance Squad.

After leaving the Urban Dance Squad he was in various bands like JMX and Stuurbaard Bakkebaard. He made remixes for a.o. Junkie XL (Action Radius) and De Jeugd van Tegenwoordig (De Stofzuiger).

His first solo album was released 21 September 2012 and features Kurtis Blow. The first single The Sum of the Sound was released June 2012. The second single I wanna B (funky) was released September 2012.

Discography

Urban Dance Squad
 Mental Floss For The Globe (1989)
 Hollywood Live (1990)
 Life 'n Perspectives Of A Genuine Crossover (1991)
 Artantica (1999)

JMX
 Autonome (1999)
 Parbleu (2002)

Palinckx
 Momentum and Wag

Pow Ensemble
 The 13 Bar Blues

Defunkt
 One World

Stuurbaard Bakkebaard
 L'amour (2009)

Solo project
 The Sum of the Sound (2012) ft Kurtis Blow, Pax, Torre Florim (De Staat) and Janne Schra

References 

 Ira A. Robbins, The Trouser Press guide to '90s rock: the all-new fifth edition of The Trouser Press record guide (Simon & Schuster, 1997)
 Frans Steensma (ed), "OOR's Eerste Nederlandse Pop-encyclopedie" (12th edition, Amsterdam, 2000)
 Vladimir Bogdanov, "All Music Guide to Hip-Hop: The Definitive Guide to Rap & Hip-Hop" (Backbeat Books, 2003)

External links 
Official website
The sum of the sound on YouTube

1962 births
Dutch hip hop DJs
Dutch hip hop musicians
Living people